Willy Massoth (January 1, 1911 – November 21, 1978) was a German politician of the Christian Democratic Union (CDU) and former member of the German Bundestag.

Life 
After the end of the war, Massoth joined the CDU and from 1945 to 1949 he was managing director of the CDU district association in Offenbach am Main. In addition, he was state chairman of the Junge Union Hessen from 1946 to 1953. From 1946 to 1948 Massoth was a member of the Offenbach district council. He had been a member of the German Bundestag since its first election from 1949 to 1957. He entered the parliament via the state list of the CDU Hessen.

Literature

References

1911 births
1978 deaths
Members of the Bundestag for Hesse
Members of the Bundestag 1953–1957
Members of the Bundestag 1949–1953
Members of the Bundestag for the Christian Democratic Union of Germany